{{DISPLAYTITLE:Upsilon1 Cancri}}

Upsilon1 Cancri, Latinised from υ1 Cancri, is the Bayer designation for a solitary, yellow-white-hued star in the constellation Cancer. It is faintly visible with the naked eye, having an apparent visual magnitude of +5.7. Based upon an annual parallax shift of 13.05 mas as seen from Earth, this system is roughly 250 light-years from the Sun.

This object has a stellar classification of F0 IIIn, indicating it is an F-type giant star. The 'n' suffix indicates "nebulous" absorption lines due to rapid rotation, and it shows a relatively high projected rotational velocity of 109.2 km/s. It is a variable star of unknown type that varies in brightness with an amplitude of 0.05 magnitude. The star is about 570 million years old and it has an estimated mass of 1.47 times that of the Sun.

References

F-type giants
Cancri, Upsilon1
Cancer (constellation)
Durchmusterung objects
Cancri, 30
072041
041816
3355